The Eisenhower Golf Club, named after U.S. President Dwight Eisenhower, is the golf course located at Crownsville, Maryland in Anne Arundel County. The club is just a mile from Maryland capital Annapolis, which is also the home of the United States Naval Academy.

History
Golf course was created by golf architect Ed Ault in 1969 on 220 acres of splendidly wooded landscape. The course takes golfers though forestland, around one of Maryland's finest lakes, and alongside numerous creeks and swales. This course is run by Billy Casper Golf. This course is an 18-hole with 70/71 par.

Area
The "Ike" is 6,659 yards with the slope of 126; the "Back" is 6,288 yards with a slope of 121; the "Middle" is 5,876 yards with the slope of 118; and the "Front" is 4,884 yards with the slope of 108.

External links 
 Eisenhower Golf Club official site

Golf clubs and courses in Maryland
College golf clubs and courses in the United States
Sports in Annapolis, Maryland